Mohamed Ali Ben Romdhane (born 6 September 1999) is a Tunisian professional footballer who plays as a midfielder the Espérance de Tunis and the Tunisia national team.

Biography
He played his first game with the Espérance de Tunis on 8 April 2018 against ES Métlaoui. His team won 1–0 and eventually won the title that year.

International goals

Honours
Espérance de Tunis
 Tunisian Ligue I: 2018, 2019, 2020, 2021, 2022
 CAF Champions League: 2018 and 2019
 Tunisian Super Cup: 2019, 2020, 2019–20, 2020–21

References

External links 
 
 

1999 births
Living people
Footballers from Tunis
Tunisian footballers
Association football midfielders
Espérance Sportive de Tunis players
Tunisia international footballers
2021 Africa Cup of Nations players
2022 FIFA World Cup players